Iver Hesselberg (4 November 1762  – 26 January 1838) was a Norwegian businessman who served as a representative at the Norwegian Constitutional Assembly.

Iver Magnussen Hesselberg was born at Larvik in Vestfold, Norway. He was the son of merchant Magnus Hesselberg (ca. 1729-ca. 1780).  In his youth he went to sea and became a skipper. He later settled on Brekke at Tjølling in Vestfold. He was the owner of a shipyards at Hølen in Akershus. He also operated several ships principally for the transport of grain. He was married in 1801 with his cousin Anna Catharina Cecilia Heegaard (1769-1826) with whom he had two sons, Magnus (1804-1877) who served as a member of the Norwegian Parliament and Hans Jørgen (1810-1864).

He also served as one of the  Settlement Commissioners (Forlikskommissær) on the Conciliation Board (Forliksråd) for his village for many years. Together with Anders Hansen Grønneberg and Ole Olsen Amundrød, he represented Laurvigs Grevskab (now Larvik) at the Norwegian Constituent Assembly at Eidsvoll in 1814. All three representatives supported the independence party (Selvstendighetspartiet).

References

External links
Representantene på Eidsvoll 1814 (Cappelen Damm AS)
 Men of Eidsvoll (eidsvollsmenn)

Related Reading
Holme Jørn (2014) De kom fra alle kanter - Eidsvollsmennene og deres hus  (Oslo: Cappelen Damm) 

1762 births
1838 deaths
People from Larvik
Norwegian businesspeople in shipping
Fathers of the Constitution of Norway